Pabindra Deka was an Asom Gana Parishad politician from Assam. He was elected to Assam Legislative Assembly election in 2016 from Patacharkuchi constituency. Just before Assembly Election 2021, he joined Assam Jatiya Parishad and is contesting from Patacharkuchi Constituency against BJP state president Shri Ranjit Das.

References 

Living people
Asom Gana Parishad politicians
People from Barpeta district
Assam MLAs 2016–2021
Year of birth missing (living people)